Selenops rosario is a species of spider from the family Selenopidae. The scientific name of this species was first published in 2005 by G. G. Alayón. Its native habitat is in Cuba.

References

Selenopidae
Endemic fauna of Cuba
Spiders of the Caribbean
Spiders described in 2005